Arthur Michael Lewicki (born April 8, 1992) is an American professional baseball pitcher who is currently a free agent. He previously played in Major League Baseball (MLB) for the Detroit Tigers and Arizona Diamondbacks and in the Korea Baseball Organization (KBO) for the SSG Landers.

Career
A native of Wyckoff, New Jersey, Lewicki attended Saint Joseph Regional High School. After graduating from high school, Lewicki played college baseball at the University of Virginia. In 2012, Lewicki pitched for the Keene Swamp Bats of the New England Collegiate Baseball League.

Detroit Tigers
Lewicki was drafted by the Detroit Tigers in the eighth round of the 2014 Major League Baseball Draft and signed.

After signing, the Tigers assigned him to the GCL Tigers and he was later promoted to the West Michigan Whitecaps. In 12 games (one start) between the two teams he was 2–2 with a 2.28 ERA. In 2015, he played for West Michigan where he compiled a 3–4 record and 3.52 ERA in 15 starts, and in 2016, he pitched for both the Lakeland Flying Tigers and Erie SeaWolves where he pitched to a combined 3–8 record and 3.44 ERA in 17 games (15 starts). He began 2017 with Erie and was promoted to the Toledo Mud Hens in August.

The Tigers purchased Lewicki's contract on September 3, 2017,  and he made his MLB debut the next day in the starting rotation. Prior to being called up, he was 14–4 with a 3.38 ERA and 1.18 WHIP in 25 starts between Erie and Toledo.

Lewicki began 2018 with Toledo. He was again called up on April 25, 2018 ahead of a doubleheader as the 26th man, but was sent back down the next day. He was recalled once again on May 16. Lewicki spent time in the bullpen before returning to the rotation following the DFA of Jacob Turner. Lewicki's second career start, and first of the season, resulted in allowing three earned runs on six hits over four and two-thirds innings, resulting in a no-decision.

The Tigers announced on August 23 that Lewicki would undergo Tommy John surgery during the last week of August, and will miss the entire 2019 season. For the 2018 season, he appeared in 13 games and pitched  innings, striking out 30 and posting a 4.89 ERA.

Arizona Diamondbacks
On October 24, 2018, Lewicki was claimed off waivers by the Arizona Diamondbacks. He was outrighted off of the roster on November 20. Lewicki had his contract selected to the active roster by the Diamondbacks on September 1, 2020. Lewicki was released by the team on October 21, 2020 to pursue an opportunity in Asia.

SK Wyverns/SSG Landers
On October 31, 2020, Lewicki signed a one-year, $750,000 deal with the SK Wyverns of the KBO League.

References

External links

Virginia Cavaliers bio

1992 births
Living people
American expatriate baseball players in South Korea
Arizona Diamondbacks players
Baseball players from New Jersey
Detroit Tigers players
Erie SeaWolves players
Gulf Coast Tigers players
Lakeland Flying Tigers players
Major League Baseball pitchers
People from Ridgewood, New Jersey
People from Wyckoff, New Jersey
Saint Joseph Regional High School alumni
Salt River Rafters players
Sportspeople from Bergen County, New Jersey
Toledo Mud Hens players
Virginia Cavaliers baseball players
West Michigan Whitecaps players